Harris High School may refer to:

 A.D. Harris High School, Panama City, Florida
 B. W. Harris Episcopal High School, Monrovia, Liberia
 Harris County High School, Hamilton, Georgia
 Townsend Harris High School, New York City